This is a list of state highways in the U.S. state of California that have existed since the 1964 renumbering. It includes routes that were defined by the California State Legislature but never built, as well as routes that have been entirely relinquished to local governments. It does not include the few routes that were relinquished before 1964 or the larger number of sign routes that were renumbered in or before 1964.

Each state highway in California is maintained by the California Department of Transportation (Caltrans) and is assigned a Route (officially State Highway Route) number in the Streets and Highways Code (Sections 300-635). Under the code, the state assigns a unique Route X to each highway, and does not differentiate between state, US, or Interstate highways.

List
 U.S. Routes and Interstate Highways that traverse California are also defined in the California Streets and Highways code as state routes. This list does not include these state routes as they are listed separately.
 A few cases exist, such as SR 110, where a defined California State Route partially overlaps with a federally defined Interstate Highway, while the remaining portion is signed as a state highway. This table only addresses the portion signed as a California State Route in these cases.
 Lengths for each state route were initially measured as they existed during the 1964 state highway renumbering (or during the year the route was established, if after 1964), and do not necessarily reflect the current mileage.
 The years listed reflect when the route was affected by legislative action, this is not necessarily the same year as the actual construction or signing changes to the route. Most notably, SR 275 was deleted from the Streets and Highways Code in 1996, but remained partially maintained until it was added back in 2010; and SR 42 was signed as such for over 30 years after it was renumbered 105.
 Concurrences are not explicitly codified in the Streets and Highways Code; such highway segments are listed on only one of the corresponding legislative route numbers. For example, the I-80/I-580 concurrency, known as the Eastshore Freeway, is only listed under Route 80 in the highway code while the definition of Route 580 is broken into non-contiguous segments. When a highway is broken into such segments, the total length recorded by Caltrans only reflects those non-contiguous segments and does not include those overlaps that would be required to make the route continuous.
 Some highways are not contiguous as the state has relinquished control of small sections to local governments. The stated length of the highway may or may not reflect the portions under local control.

Top 10 longest routes

See also

Notes

References

External links
 

 List
State highway routes